The Tyler Prize for Environmental Achievement is an annual award for environmental science, environmental health, and energy. Tyler Laureates receive a $200,000 cash prize and a medallion. The prize is administered by the University of Southern California and was established by John and Alice Tyler in 1973. It is regarded as the "Nobel for environment".

History
Tyler Prize for Environmental Achievement was founded in 1973 by John and Alice Tyler and was launched by Ronald Reagan. It was funded with a gift of $5 million by Jack Tyler and was initially administered by Pepperdine University.

Laureates 
 2023: Daniel Pauly and Ussif Rashid Sumaila
 2022: Sir Andrew Haines
 2020: Gretchen Daily and Pavan Sukhdev
 2019: Michael E. Mann and Warren M. Washington
 2018: Paul Falkowski and James J. McCarthy
 2017: José Sarukhán Kermez
 2016: Sir Partha S. Dasgupta
 2015: Madhav Gadgil and Jane Lubchenco
 2014: Simon A. Levin
 2013: Diana Wall
 2012: John H. Seinfeld and Kirk R. Smith
 2011: May R. Berenbaum
 2010: Laurie Marker and Stuart Pimm
 2009: Richard B. Alley and Veerabhadran Ramanathan
 2008: James N. Galloway and Harold Mooney
 2007: Gatze Lettinga
 2006: David W. Schindler and Igor A. Shiklomanov 
 2005: Charles D. Keeling and Lonnie G. Thompson 
 2004: Barefoot College and Red Latinoamericana de Botanica 
 2003: Hans Herren, Yoel Margalith and Sir Richard Doll who established the link between lung cancer and cigarette smoking. 
 2002: Wallace S. Broecker and Tungsheng Liu
 2001: Jared M. Diamond and Thomas E. Lovejoy
 2000: John P. Holdren
 1999: Te-Tzu Chang and Joel E. Cohen 
 1998: Anne H. Ehrlich and Paul R. Ehrlich
 1997: Jane Goodall, Biruté Galdikas and George Schaller 
 1996: Willi Dansgaard, Hans Oeschger and Claude Lorius
 1995: Clair C. Patterson
 1994:  and Peter H. Raven
 1993: F. Herbert Bormann and Gene E. Likens 
 1992: Perry McCarty and Robert M. White
 1991: C. Everett Koop and M. S. Swaminathan
 1990: Thomas Eisner and Jerrold Meinwald
 1989: Paul J. Crutzen and Edward D. Goldberg
 1988: Bert R. J. Bolin
 1987: Richard E. Schultes and Gilbert F. White
 1986: Werner Stumm and Richard Vollenweider 
 1985: Bruce N. Ames and the Organization for Tropical Studies
 1984: Roger R. Revelle and Edward O. Wilson
 1983: Harold S. Johnston, Mario J. Molina and F. Sherwood Rowland
 1982: Carroll L. Wilson and the Southern California Edison Company
 1978: Russell E. Train
 1977: Eugene P. Odum
 1976: Abel Wolman, Charles S. Elton and Rene Dubos 
 1975: Ruth Patrick
 1974: Arie Jan Haagen-Smit, G. Evelyn Hutchinson and Maurice Strong

Executive committee
The Executive Committee oversees the activities of the Tyler Prize, including the selection of Tyler Prize Laureates. Members of this international Committee are selected for their experience in the fields of relevance to the Tyler Prize and are assisted by the Tyler Prize Administrator, based at the University of Southern California.
The current committee consists of: 
Julia Marton-Lefèvre
Rosina M. Bierbaum
Julia Carabias Lillo
Margaret Catley-Carlson
Alan Covich
Exequiel Ezcurra
Kelly Sims Gallagher
Judith E. McDowell
Kenneth Nealson
Jonathan Patz
Jim Watson

See also
Environmental Media Awards
Global 500 Roll of Honour
Global Environmental Citizen Award
Goldman Environmental Prize
Grantham Prize for Excellence in Reporting on the Environment
Heroes of the Environment
 List of environmental awards

References

External links
 Tyler Prize for Environmental Achievement at University of Southern California
 Tyler Prize for Environmental Achievement

Environmental awards
Pepperdine University
University of Southern California
American awards
1973 establishments in the United States
Awards established in 1973